Eylül Elgalp (born January 9, 1991) is a Turkish women's football forward last played in the First League for Konak Belediyespor with jersey number 8. She made her Champions League debut in 2013. She is a member of the Turkish national team since 2010.

Eylül Elgalp was born on January 9, 1991, in Seyhan district of Adana Province in southern Turkey.

Playing career

Club
Elgalp began football playing in her early age at Adana İdmanyurdu in her hometown. After eight years of playing in Adana, she was transferred by the Black Sea-based club Trabzonspor, where she scored 23 goals in the 2010–11 season of the Women's First League. After one season with Trabzonspor, she moved to Lüleburgaz 39 Spor in northwestern Turkey.

She scored a total of 44 goals in 70 Women's First League matches she played including the 2012–13 season. In July 2013, Eylül Elgalp left her team Lüleburgaz 39  Spor after two seasons, and signed for the İzmir-based Konak Belediyespor, which had newly become league champion, and would compete at the UEFA Women's Champions League. She made her Champions League debut at the 2013–14 UEFA Women's Champions League on August 8, 2013, against FC NSA Sofia.

She retired after the 2014-15 Women's First League season.

International

In January 2006, Elgalp became part of the U-17 and U-19 national teams. She  played for the first time in national team at the match against Switzerland at the 2007 UEFA Women's U-19 Championship First qualifying round. She scored the decisive only goal in the friendly match against Russian side in 2010. She served as captain of the U-19 national team.

Since 2010 in the national team, she scored the only goal for her country's team at the 2011 FIFA Women's World Cup qualification – UEFA Group 5 match against Spain in 2010.

Career statistics
.

Honours 
 Turkish Women's First League
 Konak Belediyespor
 Winners (2): 2013–14, 2014–15

References

External links
 

Living people
1991 births
People from Seyhan
Turkish women's footballers
Women's association football forwards
Konak Belediyespor players
Lüleburgaz 39 Spor players
Adana İdmanyurduspor players
Turkey women's international footballers
Trabzonspor women's players
20th-century Turkish sportswomen
21st-century Turkish sportswomen